The 1987 Pro Bowl was the NFL's 37th annual all-star game which featured the outstanding performers from the 1986 season. The game was played on Sunday, February 1, 1987, at Aloha Stadium in Honolulu, Hawaii before a crowd of 50,101. The final score was AFC 10, NFC 6.

Marty Schottenheimer of the Cleveland Browns led the AFC team against an NFC team coached by Washington Redskins head coach Joe Gibbs. The referee was Dick Jorgensen.

Reggie White of the Philadelphia Eagles was named the game's MVP. Players on the winning AFC team received $10,000 apiece while the NFC participants each took home $5,000.

AFC roster
The players representing the AFC were:

Offense

Defense

Special teams

NFC roster
The players representing the NFC were:

Offense

Defense

Special teams

References

External links

Pro Bowl
Pro Bowl
Pro Bowl
Pro Bowl
Pro Bowl
American football competitions in Honolulu
February 1987 sports events in the United States